Oliver O'Connor (born 1975) is an Irish former hurler who played for Kilkenny IHC club St. Lachtain's and at inter-county level with the Kilkenny senior hurling team. He usually lined out in the full-forward line.

Career

O'Connor played hurling as a schoolboy with St. Kieran's College. He won the Dr. Croke Cup with the college in 1993, the same year he won a Kilkenny Junior Hurling Championship title with the St. Lachtain's club. He was also part of the St. Lachtain's team that won the All-Ireland Club Championship title in 2010. O'Connor first appeared on the inter-county scene as top scorer on the Kilkenny minor hurling team that beat Galway in the 1993 All-Ireland minor final. His three years in the under-21 grade yielded an All-Ireland U20HC title in 1994. At adult level O'Connor won an All-Ireland JHC title in 1995 before spending a number of unsuccessful seasons with the Kilkenny senior hurling team. He ended his inter-county career with the Kilkenny intermediate hurling team.

Career statistics

Honours

St. Kieran's College
All-Ireland Colleges Senior Hurling Championship: 1993
Leinster Colleges Senior Hurling Championship: 1993

St. Lachtain's
All-Ireland Intermediate Club Hurling Championship: 2010
Leinster Intermediate Club Hurling Championship: 2009
Kilkenny Intermediate Hurling Championship: 2009
Kilkenny Junior Hurling Championship: 1993

Kilkenny
Leinster Intermediate Hurling Championship: 1997, 1999
All-Ireland Junior Hurling Championship: 1995
Leinster Junior Hurling Championship: 1994, 1995
All-Ireland Under-21 Hurling Championship: 1994
Leinster Under-21 Hurling Championship: 1994, 1995
All-Ireland Minor Hurling Championship: 1993
Leinster Minor Hurling Championship: 1993

References

1975 births
Living people
St Lachtain's hurlers
Kilkenny inter-county hurlers